Alta Township may refer to the following townships in the US:

 Alta Township, Harvey County, Kansas
 Alta Township, Barnes County, North Dakota

See also
 Alta Vista Township, Lincoln County, Minnesota